The Diana of Versailles or Artemis, Goddess of the Hunt is a slightly over-lifesize marble statue of the Roman goddess Diana (Greek: Artemis) with a deer. It is currently located in the Musée du Louvre, Paris. The statue is also known as Diana with a Doe, Diana Huntress, and Diana of Ephesus. It is a partially restored Roman copy (1st or 2nd century AD) of a lost Greek bronze original attributed to Leochares, c. 325 BC.

Description
Diana is represented at the hunt, hastening forward, as if in pursuit of game. She looks toward the right and with raised right arm is about to draw an arrow from her quiver. Her left arm has been restored, and a deer has been added at her feet, although one might have expected a dog. Her left hand is holding a small cylindrical fragment, which may be part of what was once a bow. She wears a short Dorian chiton, a himation around her waist, and sandals.

History
The statue was given by Pope Paul IV to Henry II of France in 1556 with a subtle but inescapable allusion to the king's mistress, Diane de Poitiers. It was probably discovered in Italy. One source suggests the Temple of Diana (Nemi), an ancient sanctuary; another posits Hadrian's Villa at Tibur.

"Alone amongst the statues exported from Italy before the second half of the seventeenth century the Diane Chasseresse acquired a reputation outside Italy equivalent to the masterpieces in the Belvedere or the Villa Borghese", though its admirers generally confused it with the Artemis at the temple of Ephesus. It was installed as the central feature of the Jardin de la Reine (today's Jardin de Diane) laid out west of the Galerie des Cerfs at the Château de Fontainebleau; there it was the most prominently displayed and among the first Roman sculptures to be seen in France. 

In 1602, Henri IV removed it to the Palais du Louvre, where the Diana was installed in a gallery specially designed to receive it, the Salle des Antiques (now the Salle des Caryatides). At the time, its restorations were revised by Barthélemy Prieur. In 1696 it was installed in the Grande Galerie (Hall of Mirrors) of Versailles by Louis XIV. As one of France's greatest treasures, the Diane Chasseresse returned to the Louvre in An VI (1798) of the French Republican calendar (Haskell and Penny 1981:196). It was restored once more, in 1802, by Bernard Lange.

Fountain of Diana at Fontainebleau

In 1605, after the marble Roman statue had been removed from Fontainebleau, Barthélemy Prieur cast a replacement, a bronze replica which was set upon a high Mannerist marble pedestal, part of a fountain arranged by the hydraulics engineer Tommaso Francini in 1603.

At the time of the French Revolution, Prieur's bronze was sent to the Louvre, but in 1813, Emperor Napoleon offered it to Empress Joséphine to decorate her Château de Malmaison. At the same time, he ordered the present bronze, a replica cast by the Keller brothers in 1684 and formerly at the Château de Marly (demolished 1806), be placed on the fountain at Fontainebleau. Prieur's bronze was later returned to the Louvre and only in the 20th century was it brought back to Fontainebleau, where it was placed in the Galerie des Cerfs.

Other replicas
Comparable Roman replicas of the same model, noted by the Louvre's website, have been found at Leptis Magna (Libya), at Antalya (Turkey) and also Annaba (Algeria).

Besides the modern era replicas by Prieur and the Keller brothers, a full-size bronze replica was made in 1634 by Hubert Le Sueur for Charles I of England, the brother-in-law of Louis XIII. For Marly, a marble copy was executed by Guillaume Coustou in 1710. In the second half of the 18th century, numerous replicas of all sizes were created in bronze, plaster, and lead (Haskell and Penny 1981:197).

A miniature replica of the statue stood on the fireplace mantle in the Titanic's first class lounge. In 1986, Robert Ballard discovered and photographed the statue on the sea floor near the bow section of the wreck.

See also
Fountain of Diana from the Château d'Anet

Notes

References 
 Anonymous (1996). "Artemis of Versailles (Diane Chasseresse), p. 90, in Encyclopedia of the History of Classical Archaeology, edited by Nancy Thomson de Grummond. Routledge. Digital reprint 2015: .
 Collignon, Maxime (1890). Manual of Mythology, in Relation to Greek Art. H. Grevel & Co.. Page 94.
 Haskell, Francis; Nicholas Penny (1981). Taste and the Antique: The Lure of Classical Sculpture 1500–1900. Yale University Press. Cat. no. 30.
 Robertson, Martin (1975). A History of Greek Art. Cambridge University Press. Vol. I, pp. 460–461.

External links 

 Diana of Versailles
 (Musée du Louvre) Artémis à la biche, dite Diane de Versailles
Château de Fontainebleau: Le Jardin de Diane
 A beautiful example of the Stone Diana of Chasseresse Bust

Ancient Greek and Roman sculptures of the Louvre
Roman copies of 4th-century BC Greek sculptures
Sculptures of Artemis
Deer in art
Archaeological discoveries in Italy